Frida is the debut studio album by Swedish singer Anni-Frid Lyngstad, released in March 1971 by EMI Columbia. Recorded between September 1970 and January 1971, Frida was produced by her then-fiancé, Benny Andersson. Frida was her only album recorded for EMI during her contract, not counting her eponymous compilation album from 1972, before being signed to Polar and form with the Swedish pop group ABBA, a year later.

The album received positive receptions from critics, both retrospectively and at the time of the album's release, but did not chart, with the exception of her non-album single from the same year, Min Egen Stad, until Frida charted in Sweden, in April 2017 with a limited edition reissue, reaching No. 28 on Sverigetopplistan's album charts. Frida has since been reissued several times by EMI and Parlophone since the original issue of the album.

Background

Recording session
The recording session of Frida took place at EMI Studios, Stockholm, now known as X-Level Studios, on 8 September 1970 and was completed on 15 January 1971. Claes Rosendahl and Bengt Palmers both directed the conduction of the orchestra for the respective tracks for Frida. Min Egen Stad was recorded on 12 July 1971 with Andersson, Björn Ulvaeus and Agnetha Fältskog on uncredited backing vocals, and was completed 11 days later. Lyngstad's cover version of The Beatles' "The Long and Winding Road" from the recording session of Frida remained unreleased, but was shared on YouTube in 2013.

Aftermath
By the time of the album's release, Lyngstad had been signed to EMI, for four years, since she won a song contest titled 'New Faces' and appeared on a Swedish television show, 'Hylands Hörna' (Hyland's Corner), in September 1967. Not long after the release of the album,  in 1972, Lyngstad did not renew her contract with EMI, and was signed to Polar Music to record her first single for the independent Swedish record label, and eventually team up with Andersson, Ulvaeus, and Fältskog to form ABBA.  As a result, it is the only album Lyngstad has recorded, under her contract with EMI, as she has made non-album singles between 1967 and 1972.

Reception and re-release
Upon its original release, Frida, as an album, did not chart, but the album received unanimously generous praise from the critics, who noted the precision and versatility of Lyngstad, as a vocalist. For example, Sweden's biggest morning paper Dagens Nyheter (Daily News) wrote: "Professional, sure and certain LP-debut... low key but self-sure personality with sprinkles of both temperament, humor and tenderness. And she sings in this way that you understand she's got something between her ears - she sings with others words in a very intelligent way". The album was also re-released the following year as she had her first No. 1 non-album single, "Min Egen Stad", in the Swedish weekly record chart, Svensktoppen on 24 October 1971, consequently adding this song as the opening track of side two of Frida.

The Svensktoppen version of Frida, was given a second release in 1974 as a compilation under the name EMI:s Stjärnserie Vol. 7 (EMI's Star Series). Frida was out of print until EMI released a compilation album, Frida 1967–1972 in 1997, which includes all tracks from this album. As the reissue were met with positive receptions again, Critic Bruce Eder of AllMusic has described Lyngstad's vocals as "a distinctly expressive and pure instrument" with "Andersson's lean yet creative accompaniments", while noting that "one can begin to hear the attributes that would emerge on the early ABBA recordings." Frida was reissued as a limited edition 180-gram vinyl, pressed between 1500 and 3000 copies on 22 April 2017, under the label, Parlophone, who currently holds the rights to Lyngstad's recordings with EMI, coinciding the tenth anniversary of Record Store Day. Frida reached No. 28 on Sverigetopplistan's album charts, a few days after the reissue of this album.

Track listing

Standard edition

Svensktoppen reissue edition

Personnel
 Anni-Frid Lyngstad – lead and backing vocals
 Benny Andersson – piano, producer in all tracks, and backing vocals in Min Egen Stad (uncredited)
 Björn Ulvaeus – backing vocals in Min Egen Stad (uncredited)
 Agnetha Fältskog – backing vocals in Min Egen Stad (uncredited)
Bengt Palmers (sv)– conductor and arranger in Min Egen Stad, En Ton Av Tystnad, and Jag Är Beredd 
Claes Rosendahl (sv)– conductor and arranger in all tracks
 Björn Norén – engineer

Charts

Notes

References

1971 debut albums
Anni-Frid Lyngstad albums
Albums produced by Benny Andersson
Record Store Day releases
EMI Records albums
Swedish-language albums